Kill the King is the upcoming twelfth studio album by American rapper T.I. It is set to be released via Grand Hustle Records. T.I. had announced this album would be his final solo album.

Background
On May 20, 2021, T.I. released a lyric video for his song, “What It's Come To.” At the end of the visuals, it is revealed that T.I.’s working on his “final album,” unveiling Kill the King as the album's title. In a message, T.I. said that the follow-up to his 2020 effort The L.I.B.R.A. is “coming soon.” T.I. had been hinting at retirement as far back as 2017, when he appeared on The Breakfast Club radio show, and spoke about his plans to leave the music industry: 

The following year, in 2018 T.I. went on to release his tenth studio album, Dime Trap. In 2020 he issued The L.I.B.R.A., meaning Kill the King would be right on track to be his third, and final, project since 2017. The song "What It's Come To" which was released as a single in promotion for the album, addresses allegations against him and his wife Tiny, who appears in the video for the song, alongside T.I.

In September 2021, T.I. was interviewed on the Big Facts Podcast, where he addressed allegations against him and maintained that Kill the King is still due to be his last album: "I don't care enough," he admits. "I just don't care about the same shit other muthafuckers out there care about...At this point. It did at one time. When I went to prison and came home, I learned what the fuck was important."

In February 2023, T.I. further elaborated on the title of the album, “I feel like the King of the South moniker is very egotistical, self-gratuitous and it’s a persona that kinda enters the room before I do physically. Big Boi cautioned me of [the title] back when I was coming onto the scene,” T.I. recalled to TMZ. “Big Boi said, ‘It sounds cool. I like it, but understand when you are king you put a big bullseye on your back. You can’t look for no favors. Life is a game of chess, and the name of the game is called Kill the King. That’s what you are setting yourself up for.’ [At the age] I didn’t really think much of it.”

Release and promotion
The song "What It's Come To" was released on May 21, 2021, as a single via digital distribution in promotion for the album. The song was produced by Villa Nova and Keepitphilthy. The song’s music video, which was released on June 8, was directed by T.I. himself under his VisionMob banner.

References

Upcoming albums
T.I. albums
Grand Hustle Records albums
Empire Distribution albums